The 1939 NFL Championship Game was the seventh league championship game of the National Football League (NFL), held on December 10 inside the Milwaukee Mile, located at the Wisconsin State Fair Park in West Allis, Wisconsin, a suburb of Milwaukee.

The New York Giants (9–1–1), the defending champions, played the Western Division champion Green Bay Packers (9–2). The teams had met in the previous year's title game in New York City, which the Giants won by six points, but did not play each other in the  regular season. For the title game in Wisconsin, the Packers were favored by ten points.

The host Packers scored a touchdown in the first quarter and led 7–0 at halftime. They dominated in the second half to win 27–0 and secure their fifth title—two more than any other franchise. At the time, it was the highest attended sporting event in the Milwaukee area.

The "Dairy Bowl" football stadium was dedicated at halftime with the breaking of a bottle of milk. On hand were Governor Julian Heil and Mayor Daniel Hoan of Milwaukee.

Scoring summary
Sunday, December 10, 1939
Kickoff: 1:30 p.m. CST

Statistics

Source:

Officials
Referee: Bill Halloran
Umpire: Ed Cochrane
Head Linesman: Tom Thorp
Field Judge: Dan Tehan 

Attendance and receipts
The Packers moved the game from Green Bay to the larger metropolitan area of Milwaukee in hopes of increasing attendance; 32,379 paid to watch.  The gross gate receipts of $83,510.35 set a new record.

The title game tickets went on sale at noon on Monday, six days before the game, in both Green Bay and Milwaukee and were nearly sold out in the first 24 hours. Face value prices ranged from $1.10 to $4.40 per seat, the equivalent of $22 to $87 in 2021.

Team shares
The gate was distributed as follows:
 The Packers took $23,231.06, with their 33 players each receiving $703.97.
 The Giants took $15,487.37, with their 34 players each receiving $455.57.
Source

Team rosters
Source:

Pro football in Milwaukee
The Green Bay Packers played several games a year in Milwaukee for 62 seasons, from 1933 through 1994. The team played at Borchert Field in 1933, State Fair Park (in West Allis) from 1934 through 1951, Marquette Stadium in 1952, and then moved to County Stadium when it opened in 1953.

The 1939 game was the only NFL championship game played in the Milwaukee area; under head coach Vince Lombardi, the 1961, 1965, and 1967 title games were played in Green Bay at Lambeau Field ("City Stadium" in 1961). A tiebreaker playoff game was also played in Green Bay in 1965 against the Baltimore Colts to determine the Western Conference champion. In , the NFL expanded to 16 teams in four divisions and all the winners went to the playoffs. In the first round, Green Bay (9–4–1) hosted the Los Angeles Rams (11–1–2) in Milwaukee at County Stadium. Under Lombardi, the Packers won all five playoff games in Wisconsin.

In 1940 and 1941, the Dairy Bowl at State Fair Park also served as the home of the Milwaukee Chiefs of the third American Football League. The 50-yard line sat where the start-finish line is currently located. The city's own entry in the NFL, the Milwaukee Badgers, lasted just five seasons, from 1922 to 1926, and played at Athletic Park, renamed Borchert Field in 1928.

References

Green Bay Packers postseason
National Football League Championship games
New York Giants postseason
Championship Game
NFL Championship Game
NFL Championship Game
West Allis, Wisconsin